Mellansel is a locality situated in Örnsköldsvik Municipality, Västernorrland County, Sweden with 827 inhabitants in 2010.

History

Mellansel was first discovered by humans in 300 BC however Mellansel did not become a permanent settlement until the middle ages. Mellansel was first mentioned in books in the year 1523.

Transportation

Mellansel became a railway junction when the railway line from Mellansel to Örnsköldsvik was opened to traffic on 1 November 1892. Since the night train traffic has been transferred to the Bothnia Line, no passenger trains have been running through Mellansel station since 2012.

Mellansel Airport (ICAO-code ESUI) is located 4 kilometers south of Mellansel. It opened on 1 July 1973 and no commercial flights operate of it as of 2020.

Industry

The largest industry in Mellansel is Bosch Rexroth AB, which manufactures hydraulic drive systems.

Society

There is a college and an outdoor swimming pool in the area. Some of the buildings on the college campus were named after Mellansel's cultural history.

Population

In recent years, Mellansel has become a Population declining area.

Gallery

References 

Populated places in Örnsköldsvik Municipality
Västernorrland County